Linda Coleman (born July 12, 1949) is an American politician from the state of North Carolina. Coleman was elected to three terms as a Democratic state representative in the North Carolina General Assembly before being appointed Director of the Office of State Personnel by the Governor in 2009.

Early life and education
She attended public schools in Greenville and North Carolina A&T University. She later earned a master's degree in public administration. Her first job out of college was as a classroom teacher.

Early political career and state legislature
Before serving in the North Carolina House of Representatives, Coleman was a Wake County Commissioner for four years, and worked as human resources management director at the State Departments of Agriculture and Administration and as personnel director for the Department of Community Colleges.

In the legislature, she represented Eastern Wake County, North Carolina. Coleman was elected for the first time in 2004 and re-elected in 2006 and 2008. In her first term, she served as chair of her freshman class in the North Carolina House Democratic Caucus.

Electoral history

2018 U.S. House election

Coleman was the Democratic nominee for North Carolina's 2nd congressional district in the 2018 general election. She was narrowly defeated by incumbent Republican George Holding.

2016 lieutenant gubernatorial election

Coleman ran for Lieutenant Governor again in 2016. She won the Democratic primary on March 15 with approximately 51 percent of the vote over three challengers. Coleman was defeated again by Forest in the November rematch.

2012 lieutenant gubernatorial election

Coleman ran for Lieutenant Governor of North Carolina in the 2012 election, and had the backing of the State Employees Association of North Carolina. The News and Observer also endorsed Coleman, calling her "the better-qualified and more moderate choice." She lost the general election by a narrow margin to Republican Dan Forest.

2008

2006

2004

References

External links

News & Observer: Perdue appoints Coleman to Personnel
Campaign site

1949 births
Living people
People from Greenville, North Carolina
People from Wake County, North Carolina
North Carolina A&T State University alumni
University of Pittsburgh alumni
20th-century African-American people
20th-century African-American women
21st-century African-American women
21st-century American politicians
21st-century African-American politicians
21st-century American women politicians
African-American state legislators in North Carolina
Women state legislators in North Carolina
County commissioners in North Carolina
Democratic Party members of the North Carolina House of Representatives
Candidates in the 2018 United States elections